Jere A. Blount (born February 18, 1826 in Danville, Vermont) was a member of the Wisconsin State Assembly during the 1876 session. Additionally, he was a town clerk and city alderman in 1870 and 1874 He was a Democrat.

References

People from Danville, Vermont
Politicians from Janesville, Wisconsin
Wisconsin city council members
City and town clerks
1826 births
Year of death missing
Democratic Party members of the Wisconsin State Assembly